Queensberry may refer to:

People, characters, and titles
 Duke of Queensberry, a hereditary title in Scotland
 Duchess of Queensbury
 Marquess of Queensberry, a hereditary title in Scotland
 Marchioness of Queensbury, consort to the Marquess of Queensberry
 Earl of Queensberry, a hereditary title in Scotland
 Countess of Queensberry, consort to the Earl of Queensberry

Places
 Queensberry (hill), Lowther Hills,  Southern Uplands, Scotland, UK; a 697 m hill
 Queensberry, New Zealand, a locality in Otago region 
 Queensberry Bay (bay), Eastern Cape, South Africa; see List of bays of South Africa

Facilities and structures
 Queensberry Hotel, Dumfries, Scotland, UK; a listed building
 Queensberry House,  Canongate, Edinburgh, Scotland, UK; a listed building and part of the Scottish Parliament complex

Other uses
 Queensberry (band), an all-female German pop group
 Marquess of Queensberry rules in boxing

See also

 Volume I (Queensberry album), aka Queensberry Volume I
 "The Song" (Queensberry song), aka The Queensberry Song
 Queensberry Bay (town), Eastern Cape, South Africa
 Queensbury (disambiguation)